There have been two baronetcies created for persons with the surname Adam, both in the Baronetage of the United Kingdom. One creation is extant as of 2009.

The Adam Baronetcy, of Blair Adam in the County of Kinross, was created in the Baronetage of the United Kingdom on 20 May 1882 for Charles Adam, who was later Lord Lieutenant of Kinross-shire from 1909 to 1911. The title was in honour of his late father, the Liberal politician and colonial administrator William Patrick Adam, whose widow Emily Adam was granted the precedence of a baronet's wife the same year. William Patrick Adam was the son of Admiral Sir Charles Adam, son of William Adam, only surviving son of the architect John Adam, brother of architects Robert Adam and James Adam. John Adam and Sir Frederick Adam, uncles of William Patrick Adam, also gained distinction. Sir Charles Adam, 1st Baronet, died childless in 1922, when the baronetcy became extinct. His estates were passed on to his nephew, Charles Keith Adam, who served as Lord Lieutenant of Kinross-shire between 1955 and 1966.

The Adam, later Forbes Adam Baronetcy, of Hankelow Court in the County of Chester, was created in the Baronetage of the United Kingdom on 15 February 1917 for the industrialist Frank Adam. His eldest son, Ronald (1885–1982) the second Baronet, was a General in the British Army. He was succeeded by his nephew Christopher (1920–2009), the third Baronet. He was the son of Eric Graham Forbes Adam, second son of the first Baronet. The fourth baronet was Stephen Timothy Forbes Adam (1923–2019), son of Colin Forbes Adam, third son of Sir Frank.

Adam baronets, of Blair Adam (1882)
Sir Charles Elphinstone Adam, 1st Baronet (1859–1922)

Adam, later Forbes Adam baronets of Hankelow Court, Sussex (1917)

Sir Frank Forbes Adam, 1st Baronet (1846–1926)
Sir Ronald Forbes Adam, 2nd Baronet (1885–1982)
Sir Christopher Eric Forbes Adam, 3rd Baronet (1920–2009)
The Revd Sir (Stephen) Timothy Forbes Adam, 4th Baronet (1923–2019)
Sir Nigel Colin Forbes Adam, 5th Baronet (1930–2022)
Sir Charles David Forbes Adam, 6th Baronet (born 1957)

See also
 Adams baronets

References
Beauclerk Dewar, Peter. Burke's landed gentry of Great Britain, 19th edition. Wilmington, Delaware: Burke's Peerage and Gentry LLC, 2001.

External links
Portrait of Sir Frank Adam, 1st Baronet, at the National Portrait Gallery

Extinct baronetcies in the Baronetage of the United Kingdom
Baronetcies in the Baronetage of the United Kingdom